The Ministry of Finance or Ministry of Treasury (MH) is the department of the Government of Spain responsible for planning and carrying out the government policy on public finance and budget. It applies and manages the regional and local financing systems and the provision of information on the economic-financial activity of the different Public Administrations.

The Finance Ministry also manages the cadastre and collects all the State taxes through the Agencia Tributaria as well as controlling the state-owned enterprises through the State Company of Industrial Participations (SEPI). Likewise, the MH manages the central government goods, the European funds and the public lottery. However, most of its duties are carried out by autonomous agencies like the Tax Agency and the Royal Mint.

The MH is headed by the Minister of Finance, who is appointed by the King of Spain at request of the Prime Minister. The Minister is assisted by three main officials, the Secretary of State for Finance, the Secretary of State for Budgets and Expenditures and the Under-Secretary of the Department.

Since June 2018, the current Minister of the Treasury is María Jesús Montero, who previously served as Regional Minister of Finance of the region of Andalusia.

History

Origin 
The Ministry of the Treasury, along with the Foreign Ministry and the Justice Ministry, is one of the oldest ministries of Spain that currently exists (the Ministry of Defence, too, but since the 18th century has been split into several ministries). The history of the Ministry of the Treasury dates back to 1705 when the first Bourbon King, Philip V, tried to fix the financial problems that the Habsburg dynasty had provoked. At the same time, this body was created to centralized the power of all the Monarchy. Before this, the traditional Royal Treasury was composed by several bodies, divided between the Crowns of Castile and Aragon.

The Crown of Castile's main treasury body was the Supreme Finance Council created in 1523 and deeply reformed in 1658. Along with this, there was an accountant body of royal servants that existed from the very beginning of the Kingdom of Castile and the General Superintendency of Finance created in 1687.

The Crown of Aragon had as its main finance institutions were the General Manager and the Rational Master of the Court. In both cases and during the 16th and 17th centuries there was one for each of the territories that make up the Aragonese Crown.

After the War of Succession, both Crowns finally merged into the Kingdom of Spain and the finance institutions were structured according to the Castilian organization. However, the traditional Castilian model also did not work in a desirable way, due to its own organizational structure and the serious situation in which the Crown's incomes were found. Many of the incomes had been leased to private individuals during the 17th century, shriveling the income of the Royal Treasury.

Early period 
In 1705 King Felipe V divided the unique Secretariat of the Universal Dispatch in two: one secretariat for War and Treasury and other for "everything else". In 30 November 1714, the Ministry was de facto created as Veeduría General (roughly in ) and headed by the Universal Inspector of the Inspectorate-General, the primitive denomination of the current position of Minister of Finance. This organization lasted a short time and disappeared in 1716. From that moment, the responsibilities of treasury merged with justice and Indies affairs.

In 1 December 1720, they treasury affairs were confirmed as a Secretariat of State.

During the reign of Ferdinand VI, the Treasury recovered direct power over some taxes and in 1754 it was created an independent Secretariat of State for the Treasury in charge of the finances of the Peninsular Spain (the finances over the Indies were assigned to the Secretariat of State of the Indies).

With the Royal decree of 1754, a truly bureaucratic administration for the treasury was created. Part of that administration were the General Superintendence of the Royal Treasury and the Directorate of General Revenue, in charge of collecting the most beneficial taxes for the Crown: customs duties and those derived from tobacco, salt and lead, among others. All these departments maintained a certain independence from each other, to the point that the directorates-general functioned as today autonomous bodies do. and an organic subordination barely existed.

To avoid conflicts of competence that could arise between the Secretary of State of the Treasury and the Superintendency of the Treasury, they were resolved by making the holder of both were the same person: the Secretary of State. However, they were strong organs and a good proof of this was the construction in the main cities of the Kingdom of palaces destined to house their employees. This is the reason for the current existence of customs buildings in Valencia —today High Court of Justice of the Valencian Community—, Barcelona, Málaga (today Museum of Malaga) and in Madrid —current headquarters of the Ministry—. All of them were architectural projects of great importance undertaken during the reigns of Ferdinand VI, Charles III and Charles IV.

A single tax 
Since 1754, the Directorate for General Revenues was defined as the body in charge of controlling the main taxes and existing revenues. Fundamentally the income of customs and provincial taxes. From within this Directorate, promoted by the Marquess of the Ensenada, Secretary of State for the Treasury, took place the creation of a general cadastre for Castile aimed at reducing the many indirect taxes and few direct contributions to a single tax, which had previously been created in the territories of the old Crown of Aragon during the reign of Philip V. Although the project failed, a whole program to be followed by the subsequent owners of the portfolio was established.

During the reign of Charles IV an economic crisis began to take place in Spain, aggravated by the European political instability arising from the French Revolution. The reflection in the organization of the Administration was immediate: in 1790 the Secretary of State and the Universal Dispatch of the Indies disappears. The matters of American taxation were incorporated into the Treasury and it exists from that moment and up to 1836, except in specific periods. The ministry was structured through two offices, one for the taxation in Spain and the other for the Indies.

Wars 
In 1793 began a continuous period of wars that did not end until 1845 and the main resource that sustained them was the public debt that did not stop growing and that had, among other consequences, the creation of the Bank of Spain, the establishment of a confiscation policy and the creation of a budgetary system to control the deficit. In 1795 the Superintendency of the Treasury was suppressed assuming its responsibilities the ministry. Between the Peninsular War (1808-1814), it existed two treasury ministries, one belonging to the Napoleonic government and other to the Spanish one.

For a better organization, in 1824, during the reign of Ferdinand VII, it was created the Directorate-General for the Treasury—that still exists today—as a redistributive body of public funds and in 1834 the current Undersecretariat of Finance was created with multiple bodies depending on it. This last reform was important because it was the moment when the Councils were suppressed and the Courts of Justice was created. In 1836, the administration continued growing and the Directorate-General for Confiscated Properties was created —direct predecessor of the current Directorate-General for the State Heritage— and the Treasury Offices for the Indies are suppressed.

Tax reform 
The unstoppable constitutionalist process that took place during the reign of Isabella II imperatively needed a sound public finances as a basic instrument to create wealth and provide political stability to the rising bourgeoisie. With the rise to power of the moderate party took place the tax reform of 1845, due to the decided personal push of the Secretary of State and the Dispatch of the Treasury, Alejandro Mon. This tax reform meant the end of the complex tax system of the Ancien Régime through a strong simplification that for the first time gave importance to direct taxes and reduced indirect taxes, a reform that today is considered the beginning of the modern Treasury. It was also at this time that the Ministry acquired the current name.

The minister Mon reform implied a new organic structure, to adapt its machinery to the new circumstances. It also involved the transfer of the Department to its current headquarters: the building of the Real Casa de la Aduana. This responded to the need to centralize and group in the same place both the Secretariat and the Directorates-General for Taxes and the Treasury, which, as noted above, enjoyed a high degree of autonomy from the Ministry.

The Ministry 
If Mon was the creator of a contemporary treasury from the point of view of the technique and tax law, Bravo Murillo, head of the Treasury in 1849 and in 1850, designed the Treasury as a fundamental pillar of the General State Administration. In fact, under the term of Bravo Murillo, the Accounting Act of 1850 was passed. He consecrated the term «Ministry» to replace the classic one of «Secretary of State and of the Dispatch» and he organized the Department under a modern bureaucratic pattern. With him, the authority of the Minister on the directors general was reinforced and the directorates-general for Direct and Indirect Taxes, for Accounting —predecessor of the current Office of the Comptroller General of the State Administration—, for the Debt and also for the Contentious —predecessor of the current Solicitor General— were consecrated like classic organs of the Public Treasury, Besides that, Bravo Murillo also promoted the creation of the General Deposit Fund, an instrument initially designed to rid the State of the dependence on banks when it comes to obtaining new loans. But in the end it did not have the expected effects.

The development of the country and the need to remove it definitively from the financial crises that took place during the 19th century led to new economic and tributary reforms carried out by the ministers Laureano Figuerola (1869), Navarro Reverter (1895) and Raimundo Fernández Villaverde (1902-1903). This, together with the culmination of the codifying process in Spain, influenced new organic reforms of the Public Treasury and the beginning of the consolidation of a new bureaucratic structure.

Budget and expenditure control 
Between 1873 and 1878 the General Comptroller of the State Administration (the internal supervisory agency of the state public sector) was institutionalized. In 1881 the State Solicitors Corps was created coinciding with the consecration of the economic-administrative procedure. The same year, it was created the Inspectorate-General of the Treasury as an instrument to improve provincial economic management. The immediate effect was the creation of the Treasury Delegations in the provinces.

Between 1902 and 1903 a suitable administrative structure was adopted for the tax reform planned by Fernández Villaverde. In addition, each directorate-general was regulated by a specific regulation of its own. In 1906, with the approval of the Parcel Property Cadastre Act, promoted by Minister Moret and assisted by José Echegaray as Chairman of the Committee in charge of drafting the draft bill, progress will be made in consolidating a system of direct taxes. In 1911, the Treasury Administration and Accounting Act was approved, the backbone of the entire system of budgetary control and public expenditure.

This administrative structure remained practically unchanged until 1957. During this period, the abolition of the Ministry of Treasury between 1923 and 1925 deserves special mention, due to the structure implemented by the Military Directorate presided over by Primo de Rivera.

During the Second Spanish Republic, different organic reforms were also undertaken, among which the creation of the Central Economic-Administrative Court stands out. However, all this period is opaqued by the tragedy of the Spanish Civil War from 1936 to 1939. The Civil War provokes the creation on each side of the conflicts its own treasury departments: in the republican side, the Ministry of Finance and Economy and in the rebellious side the Finance Commission, later transformed in 1938 in the Ministry of Finance. After the war, the Francoist regime established an autarky system that was suppressed in the late 1950s.

In 1957 a new tax reform was carried out and opened the way to raise the national income and remove the country definitively from the economic situation that followed the Civil War. This reform needed a modern, simplified and efficient Treasury. In 1959 an Undersecretariat for the Treasury and Public Expenses was created in charge of the control of the financial resources of the State and of the preparation of the Budgets. It was the moment in which the mechanization of processes in administration is introduced, the embryo of tax informatics. Study and tax information services were strengthened during this period.

As a result of the 1959 Stabilization Plan promoted by Minister Mariano Navarro Rubio, between 1963 and 1964 the process of tax reform culminated with the approval of the General Tax Act and Tax System Reform Act. New taxes were systematized (on income and on business traffic). This implied above all a reform of the technical bodies of the Treasury in order to specialize them even more in the new tax system. The economic austerity plan of 1967 led to new reforms, simplifying the structure of the Ministry when the Undersecretary for Treasury and Public Expenditure was abolished.

1978 Constitution 
The late 1970s Taxation Reform Plans, the approval of the General Budgetary Act and the approval of the Urgent Measures for Fiscal Reform Act, both in 1977, prepared the ground for the Spanish Constitution of 1978. In 1992, the Spanish Tax Agency was created, a public body in charge of the management of the state tax system and the customs, as well as the resources of other national or European Public Administrations and Entities. Its creation supposes the harmonization of the organization of the tributary activity with the practices followed in the rest of the world.

With the arrival of democracy, it was very common to see the ministries of Finance and Economy together (1982-2000; 2004-2011). However, today these ministries are different departments although closely related because the competences of these ministries are complementary, Between 2011 and 2016 it assumed the responsibilities of the Ministry for Public Administrations and between 2016 and 2018 it assumed the functions on the civil service. Currently, the Ministry of Finance name is widely accepted because the Public Treasury is controlled by the Economy Ministry.

Structure

The Ministry of Finance is organised in the following bodies:

 The Secretariat of State for Finance.
 The General Secretariat for Regional and Local Financing.
 The Directorate-General for Budgetary Stability and Territorial Financial Management
 The Directorate-General for Taxes.
 The Directorate-General for the Cadastre.
 The Central Economic-Administrative Court.
 The Secretariat of State for Budgets and Expenditures.
 The General Secretariat for European Funds.
The Directorate-General for European Funds.
The Directorate-General for the Recovery and Resilience Plan and Facility.
The Directorate-General for Budgets.
 The Directorate-General for Personnel Costs.
 The Office of the Comptroller General of the State Administration.
 The Secretariat of State for the Civil Service.
The Directorate-General for the Civil Service
The Directorate-General for Public Governance
The Office of Conflicts of Interest
The Undersecretariat of Finance.
 The Technical General Secretariat.
 The Directorate-General for State Heritage.
 The Inspectorate-General.
 The Directorate-General for Rationalization and Centralization of Contracting.
The Budget Office.
The Administrative Office.

Ministry agencies and enterprises 

 The Spanish Tax Agency (AEAT).
The Customs Surveillance Service (SVA).
 The Office of the Comptroller General of the State Administration (IGAE).
 The State Lottery and Gambling Company (SELAE).
 The State Company of Industrial Participations (SEPI).
 The Institute for Fiscal Studies (IEF).
 The Commissioner for the Tobacco Market (CMT).
 The Royal Mint of Spain (FNMT-RCM).
 The State Vehicle Fleet (PME).
 The Independent Office for Regulation and Supervision of Public Procurement (OIReScon)

Budget
For 2023, the Finance Department Budget is € 21.7 billion. Of those, 18.1 billion are directly managed by the Ministry and 3.6 billion are managed by its agencies and companies.

Apart from the direct budget of the Department, the Ministry also indirectly manages the following general budget sections:

 Centralized Contracting: 317 million through the Directorate-General for Rationalization and Centralization of Contracting.
 Contribution to Administrative Mutualism: 2.4 billion through the Directorate-General for Budget.
 Financial relations with the European Union: 18.04 billion through the Directorate-General for European Funds.
 Contingency Fund: 3.9 billion through the Directorate-General for Budget.
 All kind of funds to finance regional and local administrations: 47.9 billion through the General Secretariat for Regional and Local Financing.

List of Ministers of Economy and the Treasury of Spain

Notes and references 

Economy and finance ministers of Spain
Economy And Finance
Economy and Finance
Spain
Government ministries of Spain
Financial regulatory authorities of Spain
Ministries established in 1714
1714 establishments in Spain